Adam Contzen (17 April 1571, Monschau (Montjoie), Duchy of Jülich—19 June 1635, Munich) was a German Jesuit economist and exegete.

Contzen was born in 1573, or, according to Carlos Sommervogel, in 1575. Friedrich Wilhelm Bautz gives the 1571 date listed above. Contzen entered the Society of Jesus at Trier in 1595. He was professor of philosophy in the University of Würzburg in 1606, and was transferred to the University of Mainz in 1610, where he occupied the chair of Holy Scripture for more than ten years. He had a share in the organization of the University of Molsheim, in Alsace, of which he was chancellor in 1622-23.

Contzen was a learned and versatile writer in theological controversy, in political economy, and in the interpretation of scriptures. He defended the controversial works of Cardinal Bellarmine against the attacks of Professor David Pareus of Heidelberg. When the latter sought to unite the Calvinists and the Lutherans against the Catholics, Contzen demonstrated the impractical nature of the project in his work, De unione et synodo Evangelicorum, and showed the only way of restoring peace to the German nation in his important work De Pace Germaniæ libri duo, priore de falsâ, alter de verâ (Mainz, 1616). This work was twice reprinted in Cologne, in 1642 and in 1685. His ideas on the restoration of peace were further developed in the works occasioned by the centenary of the Reformation, one of which, Jubilum Jubilorum, was published (1618) in Latin and German.

His most interesting work, which marks him as a thinker in advance of his age, Politicorum lib. X, was published in Mainz in 1621 and 1629. The book has been called an "Anti-Machiavelli" because the author describes the ruler of a Christian commonwealth in accordance with the principals of revelation. In the questions of political and national economy which he discusses he advocates the reform of taxation, the freeing of the soil from excessive burdens, state ownership of certain industries for the purposes of revenue, indirect taxation of objects of luxury, a combination of the protective system with free trade, and state aid for popular associations. The Elector Maximilian I of Bavaria was so impressed by the ability shown in this work that he chose Contzen for his confessor. During his residence in Munich, which began in 1623, he completed and published his commentary on the four Gospels, and on the epistles of St. Paul to the Romans, the Corinthians, and the Galatians. He also wrote a political novel, Methodus doctrinæ civilis, seu Abissini regis Historia, in which he showed the practical working of his political theories.

References

 Brischar, Karl, Adam Contzen, ein Ireniker und Nationalökonom des 17 Jahrhunderts (Würzburg, 1879)
 Sommervogel, Carlos, Bibliothèque de la Compagnie de Jésus, II, s.v. (1869–76)
This article incorporates text from the 1913 Catholic Encyclopedia article "Adam Contzen" by B. Guldner, a publication now in the public domain.

1571 births
1635 deaths
People from Monschau
Academic staff of the University of Würzburg
Academic staff of Johannes Gutenberg University Mainz
17th-century Latin-language writers
16th-century German Jesuits
German economists
17th-century German Jesuits